Socha is a town and municipality in the Colombian Department of Boyacá, part of the Valderrama Province, which is a subregion of Boyacá. It borders Socotá in the east, Sativasur in the north, Tasco in the south and in the west Paz de Río.

Geography 
Socha is the largest municipality in the Natural National Park Páramo de Pisba. The Chicamocha River forms the northern boundary of Socha.

History 
Before the Spanish conquest of the Muisca on the Altiplano Cundiboyacense, Socha was inhabited by the indigenous Pirgua and Boche tribes, belonging to the Muisca.

Simón Bolívar passed through Socha in his march for the independence of Colombia. The town center was moved in 1870 due to a landslide. Close to the Boche waterfall in the municipality petroglyphs have been found.

The name Socha is derived from the Chibcha words So ("Sun"; Sué) and Cha ("Moon"; Chía), "Land of the Sun and the Moon".

Economy 
Main economical activity of Socha is coal and sandstone mining. To a lesser extent also livestock farming and agriculture are executed.

Born in Socha 
 Fernando Soto Aparicio, Colombian poet

References 

Municipalities of Boyacá Department
1540 establishments in the Spanish Empire